Country changing is a phenomenon in the figure skating world in which skaters change the country they represent in competition. There are many different reasons why competitors switch countries, but it mostly comes down to maximizing the possibility of being able to compete at the World Figure Skating Championships and the Winter Olympic Games. A skater who cannot do that representing their home country often looks for another one. Because spots to Worlds and the Olympics are allotted by country, not by skater, a skater can hope to transfer to a new country and have a better chance of becoming national champion, being sent to Worlds, and qualifying for a spot in the Olympics.

Singles
Historically, countries with deep fields have more World-class skaters than slots to the World Figure Skating Championships. Some skaters who are always left off the podium at their National Championships may start looking around for other countries to represent.    
   
For skaters from the old Soviet Union, the fall of the USSR gave them many options. They could claim citizenship of a former Soviet republic and represent that country, and it is normal to see skaters from the SSRs who formerly skated for Russia.

For skaters from the United States and Canada, it is more typical to see a skater look back to his or her family's country of origin. In previous years, this meant looking back towards Europe, but, more and more, skaters from the United States are looking south towards Puerto Rico and Mexico for countries to represent.

Pairs and ice dancing
Country changing functions differently in pair skating and ice dancing. Whereas single skaters can move as they choose, pair and dance skaters are often constrained by their need to have someone with whom to skate. More and more, pair and ice dancing teams are becoming multi-national as pair skaters and ice dancers are no longer restricting their search for a partner to their own borders.

This, combined with the fall of the Soviet Union, has led to a phenomenon that many in skating circles refer to disparagingly as Rent-A-Russian. A male skater from the former Soviet Union is paired up with a female skater from a different country. In less successful couples, the male is often much more experienced than the female, and the differences in their skill levels often leads to tension and the dissolution of the partnership. In more successful couples, the two are more evenly matched, even though the Russian may still be acting as a ringer. The woman's family often pay all the bills for the man in an attempt to keep the man from moving on to a different partner. While not all rented Russian partnerships are successful, they have made their mark on skating. Between 1993 and 2008, there was at least one multi-national couple on the ice-dancing podium every year at the United States Figure Skating Championships, and in all but two of those years, at least one of those couples was a Russian/American mix.

In pair skating, Japanese women have had success in switching countries. This has historically been mostly American/Japanese pairings, but Japanese women are now competing for Russia and Canada in pair skating at the highest levels.

Country hopping is not just restricted to one nationality or country. As skating becomes more of a global sport, more and more pairings are multinational, leading to citizenship problems. Because the International Olympic Committee requires citizenship in order to represent a country in the Olympics, pair and dance teams must weigh the risks of being able to compete at the Olympics against keeping their citizenship.

Notable examples
 Dianne de Leeuw, born and raised in the United States and having a Dutch mother, won the silver medal at the 1976 Olympics, the 1975 World Championships, and the 1976 European Championships, all representing the Netherlands.
 Alexei Tikhonov, born and raised in the Soviet Union, won the bronze medal at the 1989 World Junior Figure Skating Championships with Irina Saifutdinova, representing the Soviet Union. He then competed for Japan with Yukiko Kawasaki. He paired up with Maria Petrova in 1998 and resumed competing for Russia.
 Marina Anissina, born and raised in the Soviet Union, won the 1990 and 1992 World Junior Figure Skating Championships with Ilia Averbukh. When she teamed up with Gwendal Peizerat, representing France, she was the recipient of accelerated citizenship so she could represent France at the Olympic Games. She and Peizerat went on to win two Olympic medals, one of them gold.
 Kyoko Ina, born in Japan but raised in the United States, competed for Japan for many years as a single skater, placing as high as fourth at the Japanese national championships. She switched to skating for the United States, and skated pairs starting in 1991. She competed at three Olympic Games for the United States.
 Rena Inoue, born and raised in Japan, competed for Japan as a single and pairs skater at the 1992 and 1994 Olympic Games. She moved to the United States and teamed up with John Baldwin. Inoue received American citizenship in 2005 and she and Baldwin competed together for the United States at the 2006 Olympics.
 Yuko Kawaguchi, born and raised in Japan and competed for Japan as a single skater. Due to the lack of male partners in Japan and the federation’s focus on singles skaters, Kawaguchi’s coach paired her with a Russian partner. She then teamed up with an American and competed at the United States Figure Skating Championships. She teamed up finally with Russian Alexander Smirnov and compete for Russia. The pair have won Russian Nationals (2008-2010), 2010 European Championship, 2009-2010 World bronze medals and competed for Russia at the 2010 Olympics where they placed 4th. In 2008, she became a Russian citizen.
Ukrainian pair skaters Aliona Savchenko and Tatiana Volosozhar. Aliona Savchenko originally skated with Stanislav Morozov for Ukraine and after their split, was unable to bring in a partner from Russia to skate for Ukraine. She moved to compete in Germany with Robin Szolkowy while Morozov teamed up with Volosozhar. When Morozov retired in 2010, Volosozhar had a try out with Maxim Trankov of Russia and she would go on to switch countries and compete for Russia. However, although Volosozhar was born in Ukraine, both of her parents are of Russian origin and she was entitled to Russian citizenship from birth. She won the 2011 Russian pair title with Trankov and they became the 2014 Winter Olympic champions. Savchenko and Szolkowy are the 2010 and 2014 Winter Olympics Bronze medalists.
 In a rare case of a complete team switching countries, French-born and Canadian-raised ice dancing team Isabelle & Paul Duchesnay originally competed for Canada. They switched to skating for France in 1985 and won the silver medal at the 1992 Winter Olympics for France.
 Several skaters representing Israel have previously competed for other countries. Michael Shmerkin, Roman Serov, and Sergei Sakhnovski represented the Soviet Union or Russia, while Galit Chait, born in Israel, skated in the United States national championships.

Other skaters have not represented their native country but move to another country for skating purposes and may start representing it when not yet a citizen, such as Canadian Tanith Belbin representing the U.S. and numerous American ice dancers: Kaitlyn Weaver and Piper Gilles (Canada), Allison Reed (Georgia), Isabella Tobias and Katherine Copely (Lithuania), Caitlin Mallory (Estonia).

ISU rules
Due to the advantages of switching countries, the International Skating Union has set down rules requiring skaters to wait one year from their last international competition and must meet residency requirements in order to represent his or her new country. The IOC's requirements are much stricter, requiring every person representing a country to hold citizenship from that country. Therefore, multinational pair and ice dancing teams may not able to qualify for Olympic Games due to citizenship problems. Such a team, however, could still represent that country at the World Figure Skating Championships, as ISU rules allow skaters to represent a country as residents, rather than citizens.

The skaters' previous home federations must also release the skater before they can compete for a different country as a resident in international competition.

See also
Figure skating at the Olympic Games
List of nationality transfers in sport

References

External links
 

Figure skating
Figure skating